Kristine Kurth (born June 23, 1972) is an American former professional tennis player. She played college tennis for William & Mary and Stanford.

Kurth, a right-handed player from New York, competed on the professional tour during the 1990s, reaching career best rankings of 290 in singles and 180 in doubles. She made her WTA Tour main draw debut in the doubles at Nagoya in 1995 and the following year qualified for the doubles main draw in Quebec.

ITF finals

Singles: 6 (1–5)

Doubles: 8 (5–3)

References

External links
 
 

1972 births
Living people
American female tennis players
Stanford Cardinal women's tennis players
William & Mary Tribe women's tennis players
Tennis people from New York (state)